Mount Griffin is a mountain,  high, which stands  east-southeast of Mount Bolt and marks the southern limit of the Anare Mountains in Victoria Land, Antarctica. This topographical feature was first mapped by the United States Geological Survey (USGS) from surveys and U.S. Navy air photos, 1960–63, and was so named by the Advisory Committee on Antarctic Names for Chief Warrant Officer Joe R. Griffin, U.S. Army, a helicopter pilot in support of the USGS Topo East and Topo West expeditions, 1962–63, which included a survey of this mountain. The mountain lies situated on the Pennell Coast, a portion of Antarctica lying between Cape Williams and Cape Adare.

References

Mountains of Victoria Land
Pennell Coast